This table provides a list of scientific, nationwide public opinion polls conducted from the 2021 Canadian federal election leading up to the 45th Canadian federal election.

National polls

Pre-campaign period

Regional polls
A number of polling firms survey federal voting intentions on a regional or provincial level. Note that this section displays results from stand-alone polls, not subsets of national polls.

Alberta

Ontario

City of Toronto

Quebec

Leadership polls 
Aside from conducting the usual opinion surveys on general party preferences, polling firms also survey public opinion on which political party leader would make the best Prime Minister:

November 2022 – Present

September 2022 – November 2022

February 2022 – September 2022

Government approval polls

Notes

References 

Opinion polling in Canada
Canada